Afrosymmoca seydeli is a moth in the family Autostichidae. It was described by László Anthony Gozmány in 1966. It is found in the area of what was Katanga Province in the Democratic Republic of the Congo.

References

Moths described in 1966
Symmocinae
Endemic fauna of the Democratic Republic of the Congo